Charles "Charlie" Rees (birth unknown – death unknown) was a Welsh professional rugby league footballer who played in the 1900s and 1910s. He played at representative level for Wales, and at club level for Salford, as a forward (prior to the specialist positions of), during the era of contested scrums.

Playing career

International honours
Charlie Rees won caps for Wales while at Salford in 1912.

Championship final appearances
During Charles Rees' time there was Salford's 5-3 victory over Huddersfield in the Championship Final during the 1913–14 season.

References

Place of birth missing
Place of death missing
Rugby league forwards
Salford Red Devils players
Wales national rugby league team players
Welsh rugby league players
Year of birth missing
Year of death missing